Anacithara dulcinea is a species of sea snail, a marine gastropod mollusk in the family Horaiclavidae.

Description
The length of the ovate, dirty white shell attains 6 mm, its diameter 2.5 mm. A white, fusiform, very delicately-striated shell, with six swollen whorls, impressed at the sutures, obscurely longitudinally ribbed. The aperture is oblong. The outer lip is effuse. Under a lens the surface is seen to be very finely besprinkled with minute dust-like brown spots.

Distribution
This marine species occurs off Lifu, the Loyalty Islands.

References

External links
  Tucker, J.K. 2004 Catalog of recent and fossil turrids (Mollusca: Gastropoda). Zootaxa 682:1–1295.

dulcinea
Gastropods described in 1895